Maurice Louis Monnot (22 October 1869 - 1937) was a French painter.

Biography 
A student of French realist painter Joseph Bail. Monnot presented his works at the Salon des Artistes Français in 1906 and at the Salon des Artistes Indépendants in 1913. Monnot was a painter of still lifes and rustic interiors, with his skill at painting reflective copper effects being particularly noted and earning him praise in Paris and the provinces.

Works in public collections 
 Troyes, Musée des Beaux-Arts : La Passoire, 1912.

References 

19th-century French painters
20th-century French painters
French still life painters
1869 births
1937 deaths